The 2022–23 Duquesne Dukes men's basketball team represented Duquesne University during the 2022–23 NCAA Division I men's basketball season. The team was led by sixth-year head coach Keith Dambrot and played their home games at the UPMC Cooper Fieldhouse in Pittsburgh, Pennsylvania as a member of the Atlantic 10 Conference.

Previous season
The Dukes finished the 2021–22 season 6–24, 1–16 in A-10 play to finish in last place. They lost in the first round of the A-10 Tournament to Rhode Island.

Offseason

Departures

Incoming transfers

2022 recruiting class

Roster

Schedule and results

|-
!colspan=12 style=| Non-conference regular season

|-
!colspan=12 style=| Atlantic 10 regular season

|-
!colspan=12 style=| A-10 tournament

|-
!colspan=12 style=| College Basketball Invitational

Source

References

Duquesne Dukes men's basketball seasons
Duquesne
Duquesne
Duquesne Dukes men's basketball
Duquesne Dukes men's basketball